Bulovka is a municipality and village in Liberec District in the Liberec Region of the Czech Republic. It has about 900 inhabitants.

Administrative parts
Villages of Arnoltice and Dolní Oldřiš are administrative parts of Bulovka.

History
The first written mention of Bulovka is from 1354.

References

External links

Villages in Liberec District